Airlie (a.k.a. "Belvidere" or "Old Buckner Place") is a house in Natchez, Mississippi built in 1793.

Location
It is located at number 9 on Elm Street in Natchez, Mississippi.

History

The house was built for Stephen Minor (1760–1815), a prominent plantation owner, in 1793. It is one of the oldest houses in Natchez, dating even to the Spanish colonial period. It was rebuilt in 1800 and was added to several times.

Owned by attorney, cotton planter, and slaveholding entrepreneur William Aylette Buckner before the Civil War. Used as a hospital for Union soldiers in Civil War.

It has been listed on the National Register of Historic Places since 1982. The listing included two contributing buildings and one contributing structure.

References

Houses on the National Register of Historic Places in Mississippi
Houses completed in 1793
Spanish Colonial architecture in the United States
Houses in Natchez, Mississippi
National Register of Historic Places in Natchez, Mississippi